Paulina Porizkova (born Pavlína Pořízková, ; 9 April 1965) is a Czech-born model and writer. In 1984, she became the first Central European woman to appear on the cover of the Sports Illustrated swimsuit issue.

As an actress, Porizkova made her film debut in Anna (1987).

Early life
Porizkova was born on 9 April 1965 near Prostějov, then in Czechoslovakia, to anti-Soviet dissident parents, Anna Pořízková and Jiří Pořízka. She was left in the care of her maternal grandmother after her parents fled to Sweden to escape the Warsaw Pact invasion. Czechoslovak authorities would not allow her parents to reclaim her, and the ensuing battle was widely publicized in the Swedish press, making her a cause célèbre.

When Porizkova was seven, her pregnant mother returned to Czechoslovakia by a fake passport in an attempt to rescue her. After the attempt failed, her mother was briefly detained by the national police and then placed under house arrest with her family. In 1973, international political pressure led by Olof Palme caused the communist government to allow the Pořízek family to be reunited. Porizkova's parents divorced after her father had an affair. She and her father, who refused to pay child support for his children, have been estranged since her youth. Her mother, a midwife, remarried at least twice and, as of 2010, was reported to be serving in the Peace Corps in Uganda.

Career

Modeling

Porizkova shared the photo that got the attention of modeling scout John Casablancas. She was 13. One of her friends, who wanted to be a makeup artist, painted Porizkova's face, along with other friends, and sent the photographs to modeling agencies in Paris in the hopes of getting hired. "Soon after, a modeling agent called inviting me to Copenhagen to meet the famed model scout John Casablancas. ... He took one look at me and asked: ‘Want to go to Paris?’ As if I'd say no! The rest, as they say, is history."

Porizkova rose to become a top model in Paris during the early 1980s, and her fame spread to the United States when she posed in swimwear for Sports Illustrated. In 1984, at 18 years old, she became the first woman from Central Europe to be on the cover of the Sports Illustrated swimsuit issue. She appeared again on the cover in 1985. She was the second woman (after Christie Brinkley) to be featured on the swimsuit issue's front cover in consecutive years (1984 and 1985). Her first appearance as a model in the magazine was in 1983. She appeared on the cover and inside New York in July, 1985. Harper's Bazaar named her one of its ten most beautiful women in 1992 and American Photo magazine in its first issue declared her to be the model of the 1980s. Porizkova appeared on the covers of numerous magazines around the world during the 1980s and 1990s, including Vogue, Elle, Harper's Bazaar, Self, Cosmopolitan, and Glamour.

She has been featured in advertising campaigns for Chanel, Versace, Hermes, Christian Dior, Oscar De La Renta, Mikimoto, Perry Ellis, Laura Biagiotti, Anne Klein, Ellen Tracy, Barneys New York, Ann Taylor, Guerlain, and Revlon and appeared on the runway for Calvin Klein.

In 1988, Porizkova won what was then the highest-paying modeling contract: a $6,000,000 contract with Estée Lauder, replacing Willow Bay. The black-and-white television and print advertising campaign won praise from critics. The Estée Lauder makeover transformed Porizkova's public image from a swimsuit model to that of European sophisticate and she remained the company's face until 1995. She soon landed another multimillion-dollar contract, with Escada.

Television work
Porizkova was part of the panel of judges on America's Next Top Model (ANTM), starting on Cycle 10, replacing fashion icon Twiggy.

Porizkova continued to conduct regular weekly evaluations of ANTM participants on the show until she announced during a 12 May 2009, appearance on The Late Late Show with Craig Ferguson that she had been fired from the show. Although Porizkova maintained she was told by producers that she had an "ego problem," especially when she "consistently complained" about Tyra Banks' reported lateness to the set, ANTM executive producer Ken Mok and Banks released a statement claiming Porizkova's firing was due to "the current state of the economy," forcing ANTM to "make major budget cuts…unfortunately, Paulina was a casualty of these cuts." When questioned by ABC News journalist Cynthia McFadden about the firing of Porizkova as well as former ANTM colleague, Janice Dickinson, both of whom had complained Banks was "difficult," Banks refused to address the issue.

She appeared on Andy Warhol's Fifteen Minutes.

Porizkova was a participant on Dancing with the Stars, in spring 2007 but was voted off on the first results show which aired on 27 March 2007.

In 2009 and 2010, she played Clarissa on about five episodes of the CBS Daytime soap opera As the World Turns. Porizkova appeared in the fourth episode of Celebrity Ghost Stories''' second season.

Acting
Porizkova's film debut was in the 1983 modeling mockumentary, Portfolio. She appeared in the 1987 film Anna. In 1989, she co-starred with Tom Selleck in the film Her Alibi; she was nominated for a Golden Raspberry Award for Worst Actress for her appearance.

Porizkova appeared in Emir Kusturica's 1993 film Arizona Dream, with Johnny Depp and Jerry Lewis, in a minor role as Lewis's young Polish fiancée. She had the main female role in the 1998 film Thursday. Porizkova wrote and directed the 2001 film, Roommates. She also starred in the 2001 thriller film Dark Asylum, alongside Judd Nelson. In 2004, she starred in the romantic comedy Knots. She appeared in an episode of the Starz comedy series Head Case which aired on 24 April 2009. She appeared in a 6th-season episode of Desperate Housewives, "Chromolume No. 7", alongside model Heidi Klum. She appeared on the ABC Family drama-comedy series Jane by Design in an episode which aired on 6 March 2012, and made a guest appearance on The Mysteries of Laura in February 2015.

Writing
Porizkova co-authored a children's book, The Adventures of Ralphie the Roach with British model Joanne Russell and illustrated by her stepson Adam Ocasek, that was published in September 1992. She published her first novel, A Model Summer (Modellsommar in Swedish), in 2007, which is about a 15-year-old Swedish girl (Jirina) chosen by a modeling agent to spend a summer working in Paris in 1980. Porizkova is a blogger for Modelinia and The Huffington Post.

In popular culture
Porizkova is the subject of three songs: "Friends of P" by The Rentals, "Paulina" by No Doubt, and "Dear Paulina" (written for the film Thursday in which she appeared) by Luna. She is one of several women referenced in Sonic Youth's song "Swimsuit Issue", from the 1992 album Dirty. She was the inspiration of the late transgender model and ballroom performer Octavia St. Laurent who spoke glowingly about her in the documentary film Paris is Burning. She has said that St. Laurent's praise and idolization in the documentary was the favorite moment of her modeling career.

Personal life
Porizkova holds dual Swedish and U.S. citizenship. In 1984, she met Ric Ocasek, lead singer of the rock band The Cars, during the filming of The Cars' music video "Drive". The two married on 23 August 1989. They had two sons, Jonathan Raven Ocasek (born 4 November 1993) and Oliver Ocasek (born 1999). In May 2018, Porizkova announced she and Ocasek had separated a year earlier. 

In September 2019, while caring for Ocasek following an unspecified surgery, Porizkova found him dead in his home. At the time of his death, they were still in the process of their divorce, though he had disinherited her as well as his two eldest sons in a new will, alleging that before his recent surgery she had "abandoned" him, a legally significant term. In 2021, her dispute with Ocasek's estate was settled. Porizkova commented, "They gave me what is mine under New York state law, and we’re done."

In 2021, Porizkova briefly dated screenwriter Aaron Sorkin.

In "America Made Me a Feminist", an article she wrote for The New York Times in 2017, Porizkova stated that she considered herself a feminist.

Filmography

Bibliography
 "America Made Me a Feminist". The New York Times, 10 June 2017
 A Model Summer''. Hyperion, 8 April 2008

See also
 List of Sports Illustrated Swimsuit Issue cover models

References

External links

1965 births
Living people
20th-century Swedish actresses
20th-century Swedish women writers
21st-century American women writers
21st-century Swedish actresses
21st-century Swedish novelists
21st-century Swedish women writers
American female models
American feminist writers
American people of Czechoslovak descent
Child refugees
Czechoslovak emigrants to Sweden
Czechoslovak refugees
Participants in American reality television series
People with acquired American citizenship
Refugees in Sweden
Swedish emigrants to the United States
Swedish expatriates in France
Swedish female models
Swedish feminists
Swedish film actresses
Swedish television actresses
Swedish women children's writers
Swedish children's writers
Swedish women novelists